Marie Jean-Yann de Grace (born 19 May 1995) is a sprinter from Mauritius. He represented his country in the 60 metres at the 2018 World Indoor Championships reaching the semifinals.

International competitions

Personal bests
Outdoor
100 metres – 10.37 (-1.1 m/s, Bern 2017)
200 metres – 21.09 (+1.5 m/s, Réduit 2015)
Indoor
60 metres – 6.70 (Magglingen 2018)
200 metres – 20.95 (Aubiére 2018)

References

1995 births
Living people
Mauritian male sprinters
Athletes (track and field) at the 2018 Commonwealth Games
Commonwealth Games competitors for Mauritius